Dale Flavel (born March 16, 1946) is a Canadian politician, who represented the electoral district of Last Mountain-Touchwood in the Legislative Assembly of Saskatchewan from 1991 to 1999. He was a member of the Saskatchewan New Democratic Party.

References

1946 births
Saskatchewan New Democratic Party MLAs
Living people